The Diocese of Palm Beach is a Latin Church ecclesiastical territory or diocese of the Catholic Church in the U.S. state of Florida. The patron saint of the diocese is the Blessed Virgin Mary under the title Queen of the Apostles. The current diocesan bishop is Gerald Barbarito. The Diocese serves 280,000 Catholics in 53 parishes and missions. The Diocese of Palm Beach is a suffragan diocese in the ecclesiastical province of the metropolitan Archdiocese of Miami.

History
Pope John Paul II established the diocese on June 16, 1984 from territory taken from the Archdiocese of Miami and the Diocese of Orlando.

Reports of sex abuse

On January 7, 2015, India native Rev. Jose Palimattom, who was serving as the pastor at Holy Name of Jesus Catholic Church in West Palm Beach, was arrested for possessing child pornography and for asking a child to erase it from his phone. On September 17, 2020, a lawsuit was filed against both the Diocese of Palm Beach and administrators of its All Saint's School in Jupiter, alleging that both parties failed to protect an 11-year-old girl from repeated sexual abuse by another student in an unsupervised classroom on campus. The alleged abuse occurred between January and March 2020.

Bishops

Bishops of Palm Beach
 Thomas Vose Daily (1984–1990), appointed Bishop of Brooklyn
 Joseph Keith Symons (1990–1998)  - Robert Nugent Lynch, Bishop of St. Petersburg (apostolic administrator 1998–1999.)
 Anthony Joseph O'Connell (1999–2002)
 Seán Patrick O'Malley, OFM Cap. (2002–2003), appointed Archbishop of Boston (elevated to Cardinal in 2006)
 Gerald Michael Barbarito (2003–present)

High schools
 Cardinal Newman High School, West Palm Beach
 John Carroll Catholic High School, Fort Pierce
 Saint John Paul II Academy, Boca Raton

See also
 Catholic Church by country
 Catholic Church hierarchy
 List of the Catholic dioceses of the United States

References

External links 
Roman Catholic Diocese of Palm Beach Official Site

 
Christian organizations established in 1984
Palm Beach
Palm Beach
1984 establishments in Florida